Lukomsky or Łukomski (Cyrillic: Лукомский) is a Slavic masculine surname; its feminine counterpart is Lukomska or Lukomskaya. It may refer to the following notable people:
Alexander Lukomsky (1868–1939), Russian military commander
Boris Lukomsky (born 1951), Russian fencer
Halina Łukomska (1929–2016), Polish soprano singer 
Irina Lukomskaya (born 1991), Kazakhstani volleyball player
Stanislaw Kostka Łukomski (1874–1948), Polish bishop and political activist 
Urszula Łukomska (born 1926), Polish gymnast

See also
Huta Łukomska, a village in Poland